is a Japanese footballer currently playing as a goalkeeper for SC Sagamihara of J3 League from 2023.

Career

On 20 December 2022, Inose officially transfer to SC Sagamihara from 2023.

Career statistics

Club
.

Notes

References

External links

2000 births
Living people
Japanese footballers
Association football goalkeepers
J2 League players
J3 League players
FC Ryukyu players
SC Sagamihara players